Larry Preston Bryant, Jr. (born June 5, 1964) is a former member of the Virginia House of Delegates who served as Secretary of Natural Resources under Governor Tim Kaine.

References

External links
 

Living people
1964 births
Democratic Party members of the Virginia House of Delegates
Randolph–Macon College alumni
Politicians from Lynchburg, Virginia
21st-century American politicians
McGuireWoods people